Dejan Rađenović (born 8 May 1975) is a Serbian former professional footballer who played as a midfielder.

Club career
Rađenović came through the youth system of Partizan, making his senior debut in the final fixture of the 1992–93 season. He later played for Second League club Železnik in the 1995–96 season, helping them win promotion to the First League of FR Yugoslavia. Subsequently, Rađenović spent the entire 1996–97 season with Hajduk Kula, before returning to Partizan. He made one league appearances for the Crno-beli in the first half of the 1997–98 season, before moving to Rad in the winter of 1998. Rađenović then moved on to play for OFK Beograd from 1998 to 2001. He also had a short stint with CS Sfaxien in Tunisia.

After failing to continue his career abroad, Rađenović signed with his former club Železnik in the summer of 2001. He established himself as one of the best players in the country during his four-year tenure with the Lavovi. In addition, Rađenović won the 2004–05 Serbia and Montenegro Cup, scoring the winning goal in the 90th minute of the final. He also played for Chinese club Shenzhen Jianlibao in the meantime.

In the summer of 2005, Rađenović moved abroad again by signing with Turkish side Samsunspor. He made two appearances in the Süper Lig, before leaving the club. In January 2006, Rađenović returned to his homeland and signed with Smederevo. He then spent the entire 2006–07 season with Banat Zrenjanin.

International career
Rađenović made two official appearances for the national team of FR Yugoslavia, both at the 2001 Kirin Cup in Japan. He also represented his country early that year at the Millennium Super Soccer Cup in India, winning the tournament.

Honours
Železnik
 Serbia and Montenegro Cup: 2004–05
Sloga Kraljevo
 Serbian League West: 2008–09

References

External links
 
 
 

Association football midfielders
CS Sfaxien players
Expatriate footballers in Bosnia and Herzegovina
Expatriate footballers in China
Expatriate footballers in Tunisia
Expatriate footballers in Turkey
First League of Serbia and Montenegro players
FK Banat Zrenjanin players
FK Hajduk Kula players
FK Laktaši players
FK Partizan players
FK Rad players
FK Radnički Beograd players
FK Sloga Kraljevo players
FK Smederevo players
FK Voždovac players
RFK Grafičar Beograd players
FK Železnik players
OFK Beograd players
Premier League of Bosnia and Herzegovina players
Samsunspor footballers
Serbia and Montenegro expatriate footballers
Serbia and Montenegro expatriate sportspeople in China
Serbia and Montenegro expatriate sportspeople in Turkey
Serbia and Montenegro footballers
Serbia and Montenegro international footballers
Serbian expatriate footballers
Serbian expatriate sportspeople in Bosnia and Herzegovina
Serbian First League players
Serbian football managers
Serbian footballers
Serbian SuperLiga players
Footballers from Belgrade
Süper Lig players
1975 births
Living people